The 1947 Cork Senior Football Championship was the 59th staging of the Cork Senior Football Championship since its establishment by the Cork County Board in 1887. 

Clonakilty entered the championship as the defending champions.

On 9 November 1947, Clonakilty won the championship following a 2-05 to 1-04 defeat of St. Nicholas' in the final. This was their sixth championship title overall and their second title in succession.

Results

Final

References

Cork Senior Football Championship